David Forsyth Main (1831 – 27 July 1880) was a 19th-century member of parliament in Otago, New Zealand.

He was a barrister and died in Dunedin aged 48.

References

1831 births
1880 deaths
Members of the New Zealand House of Representatives
New Zealand MPs for Dunedin electorates
19th-century New Zealand politicians
Unsuccessful candidates in the 1866 New Zealand general election
19th-century New Zealand lawyers
Members of the Otago Provincial Council